Gestalt may refer to:

Psychology
 Gestalt psychology, a school of psychology
 Gestalt therapy, a form of psychotherapy
 Bender Visual-Motor Gestalt Test, an assessment of development disorders
 Gestalt Practice, a practice of self-exploration
 Gestalt Therapy, a 1951 book detailing Gestalt psychology
 Gestalt qualities
 Gestalt theoretical psychotherapy, an application of Gestalt psychology

Arts and media
 Gestalt (album), a 2012 album by The Spill Canvas
 Gestalt (manga), a manga series
 Gestalt intelligence, or group mind, a science fiction plot device
 Gestalt Publishing, an Australian publishing house
 Nier Gestalt, an alternative title to the video game Nier

See also